Ankushapur is a village in Medchal-Malkajgiri District in Telangana, India. It falls under Ghatkesar mandal. The village is home to some engineering colleges. The total geographical area of village is 845 hectares. Ankushapur has a population of 7,645 peoples. There are about 2,764 houses in Ankushapur village. Hyderabad is nearest town to Ankushapur which is approximately 30 km away.

References

Villages in Ranga Reddy district